"Everything You Want" is a song by American alternative rock band Vertical Horizon, the title track and second single from their third studio album. First released to alternative radio in October 1999, the single reached the top of the US Billboard Hot 100 on July 15, 2000, following a commercial release on June 27, 2000. It also peaked atop the Billboard Adult Top 40 and was Billboards "Most Played Single" of 2000. It remains the band's most successful single.

Composition
In 2009, lead vocalist Matt Scannell said he "still experience[d] joy" singing "Everything You Want" because he knew "it came from a true place". The song deals with unrequited love, and Scannell explained its background in a 2010 interview: I was in love with this girl, and she was just a broken person. She kept turning to everyone except me for love and acceptance, and I wanted so much to help her. I wanted to be the one to give her everything she wanted, but I couldn't. She just couldn't accept it from me, and it was that pain, that led me to creating the song.

Music video
A music video for the single was directed by Clark Eddy in Los Angeles. Throughout the video, a split screen effect depicts two versions of Scannell acting differently in mirror environments. Lyrics flash across the screen as the band performs the song in a bright, illuminated room with black, vertical pinstripes. Couples are shown arguing, with various messages appearing across the screen such as "every six seconds you think about sex" and "there are two sides to every story." Finally, the view blurs with a message reading "everything you want is not everything you need" as the video comes to a close.

In January 2000, the video was chosen as "Inside Track" of the month by VH1.

Track listings

US CD single
 "Everything You Want" (radio mix) – 4:06
 "The Man Who Would Be Santa" (live) – 5:33

US 7-inch single
A. "Everything You Want" (radio mix) – 4:06
B. "You're a God" (radio mix) – 3:48

European and Australian CD single
 "Everything You Want" (modern rock mix) – 4:06
 "The Man Who Would Be Santa" (live edit version) – 5:33
 "Heart in Hand" (live edit version) – 5:46

Charts

Weekly charts

Year-end charts

Decade-end charts

All-time charts

Release history

References

1999 singles
1999 songs
Bertelsmann Music Group singles
Billboard Hot 100 number-one singles
RCA Records singles
Songs about heartache
Songs written by Matt Scannell
Vertical Horizon songs